Glenn Morshower is an American character actor. He is best known for playing Secret Service Agent Aaron Pierce in 24 and Colonel (later General) Sharp Morshower in the Transformers film series. He has also appeared in many feature films and television series.

Background
Morshower was raised Jewish, studied with a Jehovah's Witness, went to a Religious Science church, and taught at a Baptist church.

Filmography

Film

Television

Video games

References

External links
 
 

Living people
American Jews
American male film actors
American male television actors
Male actors from Dallas
21st-century American male actors
20th-century American male actors
Year of birth missing (living people)